James Maxime DuPont (Edinburgh, Scotland,  — Watchung, New Jersey, United States) was an American meteorite collector.

His father was Jean Rene Claudius Dupont, an analytical chemist.
At the time of his death, he was known for having the largest private collection of meteorites in the world, and after his death they were donated to the Planetary Studies Foundation, where they were known as the "James M. DuPont Meteorite Collection". The impressive collection was gathered over thirty years while containing 1,719 individual meteorites, with a total mass over 500 kilograms. These included several which were somewhat controversial and unrecognized, along with a few others that represented new finds awaiting classification. The Planetary Studies Foundation then donated them to the Field Museum of Natural History, the combined collection having had more than 1,700 meteors and an estimated value of $3 million, creating the world's largest non government meteorite collection.

As a resident of Watchung, New Jersey, DuPont founded an industrial thermoplastics company.

References

External links
 Planetary Studies Foundation
 The Robert A. Pritzker Center for Meteoritics and Polar Studies The Field Museum
 Miller Meteor at Meteorite-times
 Collescipoli Meteor at Meteorite-times

British emigrants to the United States
1912 births
1991 deaths
People associated with astronomy
People from Watchung, New Jersey